Wrestling at the 2007 Military World Games was held in Hyderabad, India from 16 to 20 October 2007.

Medal summary

Men's freestyle

Men's Greco-Roman

Medal table

References

External links
UWW Database
Official website

Wrestling
2007
Military World Games